The following is a list of Malayalam films released in the year 2006

Films

 2006
2006
Lists of 2006 films by country or language
Malayalam films